The Academic Centre, or the centre for general theoretical and programme direction, was one of the organs of the People's Commissariat for Education in the Soviet Russia. On the strength of the "Statute of the People's Commissariat for Education", approved by the Council of People's Commissars on February 11, 1921, the Academic Centre was to consist of a scientific section (State Scientific Council) with three subsections–scientific-political, scientific-technical and scientific-pedagogical—and an arts section (Chief Arts Committee) with five subsections: literature, theatre, music, figurative arts and the cinema. In addition, the Central Archives Board and the Central Museum Board were part of the Academic Centre.

References

Education in the Soviet Union